The following outline traces the territorial evolution of the U.S. State of Washington.

Outline
Historical international territory in the present State of Washington:
Oregon Country, 1818-1846
Anglo-American Convention of 1818
Provisional Government of Oregon (extralegal), 1843-1849
Oregon Treaty of 1846
Historical political divisions of the United States in the present State of Washington:
Unorganized territory created by the Oregon Treaty, 1846-1848
Territory of Oregon, 1848-1859
Territory of Washington, 1853-1889
State of Washington since 1889

See also
Historical outline of Washington
History of Washington (state)
Territorial evolution of the United States
 Territorial evolution of Idaho
 Territorial evolution of Oregon

References

External links
State of Washington website
Washington Secretary of State History website
Washington Historical Society
Washington State History

Pre-statehood history of Washington (state)
Washington
Washington
Washington
Washington
History of the Northwestern United States
History of the West Coast of the United States
Geography of Washington (state)